Hans Boye may refer to:
Martin Hans Boyè (1812–1907), Danish-American chemist
Hans Jørgen Boye (born 1942), Danish Olympic rower